Brit & Alex were an American girl group, consisting of identical twin sisters Brit and Alex Smith.

Biography
Brit & Alex (born September 21, 1985, in Wilton, Connecticut) became child actors, appearing at age three in the soap opera One Life to Live. They later moved to London, and became known for their appearance as teenagers in advertisements for John Frieda's Sheer Blonde hair products.

Having been singers since childhood, they subsequently moved into music full-time, leaving school at age 18 to pursue careers in music. They were signed by Jimmy Iovine of Hometown/Interscope Records. Their debut single, "Let It Go", appeared in the soundtrack of the 2008 film Step Up 2: The Streets. This single also features the vocal talents of G. Bamford, and was released on April 28, 2008. Their debut album, produced by Dallas Austin and Tricky Stewart, had been scheduled for release in 2009.

The popular and critical website Popjustice.com was one of the early supporters of the girls. "Let It Go" got to Number 5 in the UK Commercial Club Chart and Number 1 in the Upfront Club Chart, and was released as a CD single in the UK on 28 April 2008. However, it failed to beat its peak of Number 75 in the UK Singles Chart.

Breakup
It has been confirmed that Brit & Alex are no longer a group. Alex Smith decided to head back to school, leaving twin sister Brit Smith to pursue a solo career. The duo are no longer signed to Interscope Records, but Brit scored a new deal and was signed to Jive Records as "Matisse". Her debut single, "Better Than Her", can be purchased on iTunes.

Discography

Album

Singles

Other Songs
 I Like Boys (B-side to Let It Go)
 Sleepless (B-side to Let It Go)
 I'll Come Running
 Little Girl
 Keep It A Secret
 If You Never Knew
 Are You Ready? [from Sheer Blonde commercial]
 Club Banger
 Too Afraid To Love You
 Lost Highway
 Get What I Want
 You Don't Even Know
 Fishin'
 BEAutiful
 It Don't Change

References

External links
 Official website

1985 births
Living people
American pop music groups
American pop girl groups
American twins
Identical twin females
Twin musical duos
American expatriates in England
21st-century American women